Andrius Arlauskas (born 16 January 1986) is a Lithuanian football midfielder who plays for FK Ekranas.

References

Profile at Futbolinis.lt
 
 Andrius Arlauskas profile. FK Ekranas. Accessed 2011-02-12.

1986 births
Living people
Association football midfielders
Lithuanian footballers
Lithuania international footballers